Athol Matthew Burchell Rowan (7 February 1921 – 22 February 1998) was a South African international cricketer who played in 15 Test matches between 1947 and 1951.

His older brother, Eric, also played Test cricket for South Africa.

References

1921 births
1998 deaths
South Africa Test cricketers
South African cricketers
Gauteng cricketers